This article is a list of golf courses in Norway.

History 
Norway's first golf course was started at Bogstad in Oslo in 1924. After that, Borregaard in Sarpsborg followed. When the Norwegian Golf Federation was established in 1948, there were four golf courses in Norway: Oslo, Borregaard, Høsbjør (near Hamar) and Bergen.

In the 1950s there were 3 new courses, the 1960s brought only one new one, which was again private, before four new courses came in the 1970s. From 1985 to 1990, the number of courses more than doubled, and in this 5-year period there were added 25 new 9- and 18-hole courses.

From 1995 to 2008 the number of golf courses increased steadily from 40 to 170.

In 2009, there were 169 golf courses in Norway. In the years following the financial crisis of 2008, a discussion emerged about whether there was an over-establishment of golf courses in certain areas, and whether some of these were sustainable and were based on a sporting focus or financial interests. In 2020, it was reported that several clubs were struggling financially as a result of the financial crisis, and the use of so-called letterbox clubs was highlighted as a possible explanation. The financial crisis has also been credited with the emergence of football golf, and some golf courses were converted to this.

Golf courses in Norway 
Many golf courses are owned and operated by a golf club. In other cases, it may be a company that owns, takes care of the operation or leases the pitch to one or more clubs. Some golf clubs may have multiple courses. The Norwegian Golf Federation requires that all clubs must have their own course or be associated with a course.

See also 
 List of golf courses in Sweden
 List of golf courses in Iceland

References 

Lists of buildings and structures in Norway
Norway sport-related lists
Lists of golf clubs and courses
Golf clubs and courses in Norway